The Netherlands participated in the Eurovision Song Contest 2000 with the song "No Goodbyes" written by Ellert Driessen and John O'Hare. The song was performed by Linda Wagenmakers. The Dutch broadcaster Nederlandse Omroep Stichting (NOS) organised the national final  in order to select the Dutch entry for the 2000 contest in Stockholm, Sweden. Eight entries competed in the national final on 27 February 2000 where "No Goodbyes" performed by Linda Wagenmakers was selected as the winner following the combination of votes from twelve regional juries and a public vote.

The Netherlands competed in the Eurovision Song Contest which took place on 13 May 2000. Performing during the show in position 2, the Netherlands placed thirteenth out of the 24 participating countries, scoring 40 points. The Dutch broadcast of the show was cut off one hour in due to the Enschede fireworks disaster earlier that day.

Background 

The Dutch least successful result has been last place, which they have achieved on four occasions, most recently in the 1968 contest.

The Dutch national broadcaster, Nederlandse Omroep Stichting (NOS), broadcast the event within the Netherlands and organises the selection process for the nation's entry. However, internal selections have also been held on occasion. Since 1998, NOS has organised  in order to select both the artist and song for the contest, a method that was continued for the 2000 Dutch entry.

Before Eurovision

Nationaal Songfestival 2000 
 was the national final developed by NOS that selected the Dutch entry for the Eurovision Song Contest 2000. Eight entries competed in the competition that consisted of a final on 27 February 2000 which took place at the Rotterdam Ahoy in Rotterdam, hosted by Paul de Leeuw and was broadcast on TV2. The first part of the national final was watched by 2.2 million viewers in the Netherlands with a market share of 38%, while the second part was watched by 2.6 million viewers with a market share of 45%, making it the most watched  since 1988.

Competing entries 
A submission period was opened by the Dutch broadcaster in July 1999 where artists and composers were able to submit their entries until 15 November 1999. In addition to the public submission, NOS directly invited certain composers to submit entries. 305 submissions were received by the broadcaster at the closing of the deadline, and the eight selected competing entries were announced on 18 January 2000. The selection of the entries for the competition occurred through the decision by a selection commission consisting of Willem van Beusekom, Saskia Bruning, Manuela Kemp, Humphrey Campbell, Ron Stoeltie and Jan Jaap de Kloet.

Final 
The final took place on 27 February 2000 where eight entries competed. The winner, "No Goodbyes" performed by Linda Wagenmakers, was selected by the 50/50 combination of a public televote and the votes of twelve regional juries. The viewers and the juries each had a total of 384 points to award. Each jury group distributed their points as follows: 1, 2, 3, 4, 5, 7 and 10 points. Points from televoting were distributed pro rata. For example, if a song gained 10% of the vote, then that entry would be awarded 10% of 384 points rounded to the nearest integer: 38 points. The rounding of televoting points resulted in a slight discrepancy, with only 381 televoting points being awarded in total. In addition to the performances of the competing entries, the show featured guest performances by Swedish 1999 Eurovision winner Charlotte Nilsson.

At Eurovision 
According to Eurovision rules, all nations with the exceptions of the bottom six countries in the 1999 contest competed in the final on 13 May 2000. A special allocation draw was held which determined the running order and the Netherlands was set to perform in position 2, following the entry from Israel and before the entry from the United Kingdom. The Netherlands finished in thirteenth place with 40 points.

The show was broadcast in the Netherlands on TV2 with commentary by Willem van Beusekom as well as via radio on Radio 2 with commentary by Hijlco Span. However, one hour into the transmission of the contest, NOS took the decision to take the programme off the air in order to bring viewers live news updates from Enschede, where some hours earlier a huge explosion in a fireworks factory had devastated a section of the city and resulted in fatalities and serious injuries. A spokesman for NOS later stated that besides having a duty to keep their viewers informed of the current situation in Enschede, they felt it would have been inappropriate to continue with the broadcast of a frivolous light-entertainment programme at such a time. A recap of the contest was eventually broadcast on 12 June 2000. The contest was watched by a total of 3 million viewers in the Netherlands.

The suspension of transmission meant that the votes of the Dutch back-up jury were used, as no televoting had taken place. The spokesperson who announced the Dutch voting results was Marlayne, who represented the Netherlands at the Eurovision Song Contest 1999.

Voting 
Below is a breakdown of points awarded to the Netherlands and awarded by the Netherlands in the contest. The nation awarded its 12 points to the Turkey in the contest.

References

External links 
 Dutch Preselection 2000

2000
Countries in the Eurovision Song Contest 2000
Eurovision